The Muncie Reds were an Ohio State League (1947) and Ohio–Indiana League (1948–1950) baseball team based in Muncie, Indiana, USA. They were affiliated with the Cincinnati Reds and played at McCulloch Park.

References

Baseball teams established in 1947
Defunct minor league baseball teams
Professional baseball teams in Indiana
Defunct baseball teams in Indiana
Cincinnati Reds minor league affiliates
1947 establishments in Indiana
1950 disestablishments in Indiana
Sports clubs disestablished in 1950
Sports in Muncie, Indiana
Baseball teams disestablished in 1950
Ohio-Indiana League teams